Rashan may refer to:

Rashan (given name)
Rashan, Kosovo
Rashan, Markazi, Iran
Mehmed Reshan or Mahmad Rashan, a Yazidi saint